Bridges of Time is a 2018 Lithuanian documentary film directed by Kristine Briede and Audrius Stonys. It was selected as the Lithuanian entry for the Best International Feature Film at the 92nd Academy Awards, but it was not nominated. The film won the Golden Goblet Award for Best Documentary Film at the 22nd Shanghai International Film Festival.

Premise
A documentary about the "Baltic New Wave", avant-garde filmmakers in Estonia, Latvia and Lithuania during the 1960s.

See also
 List of submissions to the 92nd Academy Awards for Best International Feature Film
 List of Lithuanian submissions for the Academy Award for Best International Feature Film

References

External links
 

2018 films
2018 documentary films
Lithuanian documentary films
Lithuanian-language films